Maha Min Htin Monastery is a historic Buddhist monastery in Mandalay, Burma. The monastery was established in 1852, donated by Maha Minhla Minkyaw U Min Htin and is located near the Mahamuni Buddha Temple. It was originally built in Inwa and was moved to Mandalay in 1876. Of the 426 teak columns used in the original monastery at Inwa, 143 remain. The monastery is surrounded by 3 small moats.

See also 

 Kyaung

References 

Monasteries in Myanmar
Buddhist temples in Mandalay
19th-century Buddhist temples
Religious buildings and structures completed in 1839